The Indianapolis Colts Ring of Honor honors former players, coaches, club officials, and fans who made outstanding contributions to the Indianapolis Colts football organization. 
Originally a ring around the former RCA Dome in Indianapolis, Indiana, it currently encircles Lucas Oil Stadium.

The Ring of Honor began on September 23, 1996, with the induction of then owner, Robert Irsay. Since then, thirteen players (11 offensive and 2 defensive), two head coaches, a general manager, and an honor to the fans have been added. Tony Dungy was the first to be added to the ring of honor in Lucas Oil Stadium. 

The 12th Man addition to the ring was the last to be added in the RCA Dome.  While the ring membership is not increased annually, there was at least one inductee added every season from 2015 to 2019.

Inductees 

† The Colts removed the 12th Man reference in 2016, retroactively renaming the honor "Colts Nation"

References

Indianapolis Colts lists
American football museums and halls of fame
Halls of fame in Indiana
Awards established in 1996
1996 establishments in Indiana